Austroascia is a genus of hoverflies.

Species
A. segersi <small>Thompson & Marnef, 1977

References

Diptera of South America
Eristalinae
Taxa named by F. Christian Thompson
Hoverfly genera